Life with Murder is a Canadian documentary film, directed by John Kastner and released in 2010. The film profiles Brian and Leslie Jenkins, a couple in Chatham, Ontario who are struggling to cope and heal after their son Mason was convicted of murdering their daughter Jennifer.

The film premiered at the Hot Docs Canadian International Documentary Festival on May 1, 2010, and was distributed primarily as a television film which aired on CTV Television Network on August 31, 2010.

The film won the Donald Brittain Award for Best Social/Political Documentary Program at the 26th Gemini Awards, and the International Emmy Award for Best Documentary at the 39th International Emmy Awards.

References

External links 
 

2010 films
Donald Brittain Award winning shows
Films directed by John Kastner
National Film Board of Canada documentaries
2010s English-language films
2010s Canadian films